Fei Danxu (1801–1850) was an itinerant Chinese painter during the Qing Dynasty.

Fei's courtesy name was Zitiao (子苕), and his art names were Xiaolou (晓楼) and Huanxisheng (环溪生). A later pseudonym was Ouweng (偶翁). He was a native of Wucheng (乌程 - now Wuxing, Zhejiang).

Fei began painting when he was very young in Wucheng.  He later traveled throughout Zhejiang and Jiangsu provinces to practiced his art. He is most noted for his paintings of beautiful women. Among his paintings of beautiful women is "Twelve Beauties of Jinling," which features twelve of the major female characters in the novel Dream of the Red Chamber.

He was often associated with the painter Gai Qi in what was known as the "Gai Fei" school. Fei's younger brother Dancheng, as well as his sons and grandsons, continued the tradition of painting beautiful women, as did Gai Qi's grandson.

Notes

References
 Barnhart, R. M. et al. (1997). Three thousand years of Chinese painting. New Haven, Yale University Press. 
 Ci hai bian ji wei yuan hui (辞海编辑委员会). Cihai. Shanghai: Shanghai ci shu chu ban she （上海辞书出版社）, 1979.
 Zhongguo lidai shinü huaji'' 中國歷代仕女畫集 (A collection of paintings of women through the ages) edited by Guo Xueshi 郭学是and Zhang Zikang. 张子康  (Tianjin: Tianjin renmin meishu chubanshe and Shijiazhuang: Hebei jiaoyu chubanshe, 1998) reproduces some of the paintings at nos.161-165 and contains a brief biography on p. 11.

1801 births
1850 deaths
Qing dynasty painters
People from Huzhou
Painters from Zhejiang
19th-century Chinese painters